Rinero is a surname. Notable people with the surname include:

Christophe Rinero (born 1973), French cyclist
Elio Rinero (born 1947), Italian footballer

See also
Rionero (disambiguation)